Leila Sansour is the founder and chief executive officer of Open Bethlehem, a non-governmental foundation established to promote and protect the life and heritage of the city of Bethlehem. Sansour developed the Bethlehem Passport in partnership with the city council and governor of Bethlehem. Pope Benedict XVI became the first recipient of the Bethlehem passport when he accepted the citizenship of Bethlehem from Palestinian President Mahmoud Abbas in December 2005.

Sansour is from an old Palestinian Roman Catholic family. She was born in Moscow, February 16, 1966, when her father, Anton, was teaching mathematics at Moscow State University. Leila Sansour and her family moved to the city of Bethlehem in 1973. Anton Sansour became one of the founders of the Bethlehem University, previously a Roman Catholic seminary.

Sansour is a film director who produced the film Jeremy Hardy vs. the Israeli Army [2003], following the British comedian Jeremy Hardy and his travails during the siege of Bethlehem in 2002. She began her film work in television and produced the series Cultural Portraits for Al Jazeera, featuring profiles of prominent Arabs who had made a significant world contribution in the arts, science or politics.

Sansour studied at the Sorbonne, Moscow State University and the University of Warwick. Her most recent work is the film and awareness campaign Open Bethlehem. The film has screened in festivals in the U.K., and toured Canada in September 2016, screening in Montreal, Vancouver, Toronto, and Edmonton. Open Bethlehem is an international campaign that works to promote global engagement with Bethlehem as a real and contemporary city in the Middle East. It does so by supporting the distribution of communication tools about Bethlehem to boost international interest and awareness and by promoting visits to Bethlehem through established and specialized tour operators.  The campaign also works to develop a network of passionate ambassadors for the city through the Bethlehem Passport Program.

References

External links

Leila Sansour at "Dreams of a nation", Columbia University
Open Bethlehem Film and campaign
Review of Open Bethlehem, The Guardian

Living people
Palestinian expatriates in the Soviet Union
Palestinian Roman Catholics
University of Paris alumni
Alumni of the University of Warwick
Palestinian film directors
Palestinian women film directors
Year of birth missing (living people)